Fitting can refer to:

 Curve fitting, the process of constructing a curve, or mathematical function, that has the best fit to a series of data points
 A dress fitting
 Piping and plumbing fitting, used in pipe systems to connect straight sections of pipe or tube, adapt to different sizes or shapes, and for other purposes
 Compression fitting, a fitting used to join two tubes or thin-walled pipes together
 Lightbulb socket or lamp fitting

Persons with the surname Fitting 
 Andrea Fitting, founder and CEO of Fitting Group
 Édouard Fitting (1898–1945), Swiss fencer
 Emma Fitting (1900–1986), Swiss fencer
 Frédéric Fitting (1902–1998), Swiss fencer
 Hans Fitting (1906–1938), German mathematician
 Willy Fitting (1925–2017), Swiss fencer

See also 
 Fit (disambiguation)
 Fitter (disambiguation)
 Fetting, a surname
 Fitling, a hamlet in the East Riding of Yorkshire, England
 Overfitting, production of an analysis that corresponds too closely or exactly to a data set